Vista Ridge High School is a secondary school located in east Colorado Springs, Colorado, United States. The school has a population of approximately 1,700 students, and attracts enrollment from District 49.

School activities and programs
Vista Ridge sports include football, cross country, volleyball, soccer, basketball, wrestling, softball, track and field, cheer, and golf.

The Vista Ridge High School Student Council plans social events for the school, as well as leadership building programs for its members.

Feeder schools
 Skyview Middle School
 Banning Lewis Ranch Academy
 Rocky Mountain Classical Academy
 Grand Peak Academy

Athletic accomplishments

 2013: Boys' Track and Field State Champions
 2014: Pikes Peak Athletic Conference Softball Champions
 2015-2016: Boys' Basketball Final Four
 2015: Foothills League Football Champions
 2017: Boys' Track and Field State Champions

High schools in Colorado Springs, Colorado
Public high schools in Colorado
2008 establishments in Colorado